Jim Karahalios is a Canadian politician who has never been elected to public office, and lawyer who ran as the New Blue candidate for Kitchener—Conestoga in the 2022 Ontario general election. He is the co-founder and leader of the New Blue Party.

Political career 
In late 2017, Karahalios was sued by the Progressive Conservative Party of Ontario in retaliation for Karahalios's founding the activist groups "Axe The Carbon Tax" (opposing the party's pro-carbon tax position) and "Take Back Our PC Party" (challenging the party's acceptance of nominations that resulted in allegations of electoral fraud).  Karahalios won the lawsuit when Superior Court Justice Paul Perell wrote a decision against the party ruling the lawsuit was a "strategic lawsuit against public participation” intended to stifle dissent.

On March 1, 2018, Karahalios received an apology from interim leader of the PC Party, Vic Fedeli. Robert Benzie, Queen's Park Bureau Chief of the Toronto Star,  described Karahalios with the following:  Karahalios was instrumental in exposing problems at Tory candidate nomination elections, the policy-making process and other abuses of the party constitution... Karahalios, a Cambridge corporate lawyer, has emerged as a conscience of the PC party. His crusade against Brown’s embrace of a carbon tax has been embraced by all the leadership hopefuls in the March 10 PC leadership contest.Nine days later, on March 10, 2018, Doug Ford was elected as leader of the Progressive Conservative Party of Ontario.  His leadership campaign platform, and those of the other three candidates in the race, embraced the themes of Karahalios's "Axe the Carbon Tax" and "Take Back Our PC Party" campaigns.

Candidacy 
In November 2018, Karahalios ran for the presidency of the Ontario Progressive Conservative Party and later filed a lawsuit against the party after his defeat, alleging the election process was manipulated, election rules were breached and that ballot boxes were allegedly stuffed in order to elect his competitor, Brian Patterson, who was endorsed by Doug Ford.

In January 2020, Karahalios announced he was running in the 2020 Conservative Party of Canada leadership election. By March 19, 2020, he was the third candidate in the race to raise the $300,000 in donations and 3,000 endorsement signatures the party required to have his name added to the ballot.  On March 20, 2020, the party disqualified Karahalios from the race.  On May 20, 2020, Superior Court Justice Paul Perell ruled Karahalios could re-enter the race but before Karahalios could pay the additional $100,000 fine imposed on him by the party's leadership committee, the party disqualified Karahalios from the race a second time due to accusations of racism in his promotional materials.

New Blue Party 
On October 12, 2020, Jim and Belinda Karahalios released a video announcing that they were forming a new political party, claiming that the Ontario PC Party was beyond redemption. Stating that there "is no party in the Ontario legislature defending the taxpayer, defending small business, defending places of worship, promoting freedom, promoting democracy or fighting political corruption."

On January 7, 2021, the New Blue Party was officially registered by Elections Ontario. Karahalios stated that the party would focus on supporting the taxpayer, places of worship and small business.

Municipal politics
In August 2022, Karahalios registered to run for Cambridge City Council in the 2022 municipal elections, running for Ward 5 Councilor. Karahalios was unsuccessful, receiving 21% of the vote and finishing third.

Election results

References 

Living people
People from Cambridge, Ontario
Politicians affected by a party expulsion process
21st-century Canadian politicians
Year of birth missing (living people)